Sixth-seeded Françoise Dürr defeated Lesley Turner in the final 4–6, 6–3, 6–4, to win the women's singles tennis title at the 1967 French Championships.

Seeds
The seeded players are listed below. Françoise Dürr is the champion; others show the round in which they were eliminated.

Draw

Key
 Q = Qualifier
 WC = Wild card
 LL = Lucky loser
 r = Retired

Finals

Earlier rounds

Section 1

Section 2

Section 3

Section 4

Section 5

Section 6

Section 7

Section 8

References

External links
   on the French Open website

1967 in women's tennis
1967
1967 in French women's sport
1967 in French tennis